The Girl in the Taxi is a 1937 British musical comedy film directed by André Berthomieu and starring Frances Day, Henri Garat and Lawrence Grossmith. It was based on the stage musical The Girl in the Taxi and was part of a trend of operetta films produced during the decade.

It was shot at Ealing Studios in London. The film's sets were designed by the art director Jean d'Eaubonne. A separate French-language version Chaste Susanne was shot at the same time by Berthomieu, with Henri Garat being the only actor to appear in both versions.

Synopsis
In Paris the head of a purity league is in fact leading a far from model lifestyle.

Cast
 Frances Day as  Suzanne Pommarel 
 Henri Garat as René Boislurette 
 Lawrence Grossmith as Baron des Aubrais 
 Jean Gillie as Jacqueline 
 Mackenzie Ward as Hubert 
 John Deverell as Emile Pomarel 
 Helen Haye as Delphine 
 Ben Field as Dominique 
 Albert Whelan as Alexis 
 Laurence Hanray as Charencey 
 Joan Kemp-Welch as  Suzanne Dupont

References

Bibliography
Low, Rachael. Filmmaking in 1930s Britain. George Allen & Unwin, 1985.
Wood, Linda. British Films, 1927–1939. British Film Institute, 1986.

External links

1937 films
1937 musical comedy films
British musical comedy films
1930s English-language films
Films directed by André Berthomieu
Films based on operettas
British multilingual films
Films set in Paris
British black-and-white films
1937 multilingual films
Operetta films
1930s British films